Houthulst is a municipality located in the Belgian province of West Flanders. The municipality consists of the sub-municipalities Houthulst, Jonkershove, Klerken and Merkem. On January 1, 2006, Houthulst had a total population of 9,051. The total area is 55.89 km² which gives a population density of 162 inhabitants per km².

Landmarks
 The Sint-Jan Baptistkerk (Church of Saint John the Baptist) is the church of Houthulst. It was rebuilt in 1924 after being completely destroyed during World War I.
 The , containing the graves of almost 1800 Belgian soldiers killed during World War I. The cemetery also contains 81 Italian graves. Most of the soldiers who have been buried here were killed during the final assault on the Germans on September 28, 1918, to liberate the Vrijbos forest.

References

External links

Official website - Available only in Dutch

 
Municipalities of West Flanders